Oceanic yacht racing is one of the most dangerous sports in the world. It was particularly dangerous in the early days when oceanic racing was more like early mountain climbing in terms of sense of adventure and achievement. Modern safety and communication equipment has improved safety however like any sport in natural environment risk is always present. In many races, participants have changed from explorer to professional athlete.

Deaths during crewed round the world races and record attempts

Deaths during solo round the worlds races and record attempts

Deaths during offshore racing

Deaths during yacht races

References

sailboat racing
Sailboat racing
Sailing (sport)
Sail